The 1993 Trans-Am Series was the 28th season of the Sports Car Club of America's Trans-Am Series.

Results

Championships

Drivers
Scott Sharp – 372 points
Ron Fellows – 314 points
Jack Baldwin – 306 points
Bobby Archer – 265 points
Tommy Archer – 242 points
Greg Pickett – 242 points

References

Trans-Am Series
1993 in American motorsport